Bach composed , as chorale cantata for the Marian feast of the Annunciation, for a first performance in a church service in Leipzig on 25 March 1725. The cantata, for soprano, tenor and bass soloists, four-part choir and Baroque orchestra, takes around 25 minutes to perform.

Recordings
The conductor Fritz Lehmann recorded nine Bach cantatas with the Berliner Motettenchor and the Berliner Philharmoniker with Deutsche Grammophon. Lehmann died in 1956, preventing an expansion of the project. The nine cantatas were reissued by Eloquence Classics in 2018. Fritz Werner recorded around 50 of Bach's church cantatas with the Heinrich-Schütz-Chor Heilbronn and the Pforzheim Chamber Orchestra between 1959 and 1974, recording  in 1965. Several of them were reissued in 2004. A reviewer of the first volume noted: "Fritz Werner has this music in his blood. His instincts for Bach style are generally sound and he directs the music with a profound belief in it. These are performances of quiet conviction."

In 1971,  was the first cantata for the project to record all church cantatas by Bach on period instruments in historically informed performances for what is now known as the Teldec series (it began on the Telefunken label); the conductor was Nikolaus Harnoncourt, who was one of two conductors on the project, the other being Gustav Leonhardt. While some instruments such as baroque violins were relatively easily available, other instruments necessary for historically informed performance posed more challenges, for example, the oboe da caccia which is specified in the score of this cantata. A reconstructed version of this instrument was available by 1973, when the revival of the instrument had benefited from scholarly research at the beginning of the 1970s. However, it is not clear what would have been available for Jürg Schäftlein and Karl Gruber, the oboists of Harnoncourt's instrumental ensemble Concentus Musicus Wien, when BWV 1 was recorded. Another aspect of historically informed performance is the use of all male singers (which was the norm for Bach in Leipzig). Harnoncourt conducted the first four cantatas with the Wiener Sängerknaben, with a soprano soloist from the boys' choir and a countertenor for the alto part.

Helmuth Rilling, who began a recording of all Bach cantatas in 1969 and completed it in 1985, recorded  in 1980, with the Gächinger Kantorei and Bach-Collegium Stuttgart. Thomaskantor Hans-Joachim Rotzsch, recorded Bach cantatas with the Thomanerchor and the Neues Bachisches Collegium Musicum. They recorded , coupled with Bach's chorale cantata on a hymn by Nicolai, in 1987. Pieter Jan Leusink conducted all Bach church cantatas with the Holland Boys Choir and the Netherlands Bach Collegium in historically informed performance, however with women for the solo soprano parts. He completed the project within a year on the occasion of the Bach Year 2000. A reviewer from Gramophone noted: "Leusink's success elsewhere comes largely through his admirably well-judged feeling for tempos and a means of accentuation which drives the music forward inexorably".

Masaaki Suzuki, who studied historically informed practice in Europe began recording Bach's church cantatas with the Bach Collegium Japan in 1999, at first not aiming at a complete cycle, but completing all in 2017. They released  in 2007. Sigiswald Kuijken recorded a series of cantatas with the ensemble La Petite Bande with vocalists singing one voice per part (OVPP). They recorded  in 2007. The Swiss J. S. Bach-Stiftung plans to cover all church cantata by Bach in recorded live concerts with introductions. They covered  in 2010. In 2013, a CD was released sung by the Thomanerchor with the Gewandhausorchester, conducted by Georg Christoph Biller. As part 9 of their series Das Kirchenjahr mit Johann Sebastian Bach (The church year with J. S. Bach), titled Marian Feasts, they performed Cantata 125 for Purification, Cantata 1 for Annunciation, and Cantata 147 for Visitation.

References

Cited sources

External links 
  (recordings)
 
 Brian Robins: Johann Sebastian Bach / Cantata No. 1, "Wie schön leuchtet der Morgenstern," BWV 1 (BC A173) (Description and recordings) AllMusic

Discographies of compositions by J. S. Bach